Arthur Francis George Kerr (1877–1942) was an Irish medical doctor. He is known particularly now for his botanical work, which was important for the study of the flora of Thailand.

He encouraged other botanists to collect plant specimens in Thailand, in particular Emily Collins

A number of plant species are named after him, including Dipterocarpus kerrii, Hoya kerrii, Loranthus kerrii, Nepenthes kerrii, Platanus kerrii and Rafflesia kerrii.

Also several plant genus honour his name including Kerriochloa, Kerriodoxa, Kerriothyrsus, and also the genus Afgekia which is an abbreviation of his names.

He also originated some botanical names, for example, the genus name Dimetra (Oleaceae).

References

van Steenis-Kruseman, M.J., et al. 2006. Cyclopaedia of Malesian Collectors: Arthur Francis George Kerr. Nationaal Herbarium Nederland.
Digitising the Specimens and Archive of A.F.G. Kerr, Pioneering Botanist in Thailand

External links
 Reliquiae Kerrianae by M. Jacobs 

1877 births
1942 deaths
20th-century Irish botanists